Sonny Rollins + 3 is an album by jazz saxophonist Sonny Rollins, released on the Milestone label in 1995, featuring performances by Rollins with Bob Cranshaw, Stephen Scott, Jack DeJohnette, Tommy Flanagan and Al Foster.

Reception

The AllMusic review by Scott Yanow states: "Rollins is in wonderful form, stretching out on two basic originals and five standards.... This studio set captures the excitement of a Sonny Rollins concert and is highly recommended."

Track listing
All compositions by Sonny Rollins except as indicated
 "What a Difference a Day Made" (Stanley Adams, María Mendez Grever) - 10:05  
 "Biji" - 8:18  
 "They Say It's Wonderful" (Irving Berlin) - 6:15  
 "Mona Lisa" (Ray Evans, Jay Livingston) - 3:53  
 "Cabin in the Sky" (Vernon Duke, John Latouche) - 8:50  
 "H.S." - 6:17  
 "I've Never Been in Love Before" (Frank Loesser) - 12:19  
Recorded in New York City on August 30 (tracks 3 & 5) and October 7 (tracks 1, 2, 4, 6 & 7), 1995

Personnel 
 Sonny Rollins - tenor saxophone
 Bob Cranshaw - electric bass
 Stephen Scott - piano (tracks 3 & 5)
 Jack DeJohnette - drums (tracks 3 & 5)
 Tommy Flanagan - piano (tracks 1, 2, 4, 6 & 7)
 Al Foster - drums (tracks 1, 2, 4, 6 & 7)

References 

1996 albums
Milestone Records albums
Sonny Rollins albums
Albums produced by George Avakian